RCS, originally Radio Computing Services, is a provider of scheduling and broadcast software for radio, Internet and television stations.

History
RCS was founded in 1979 by Dr. Andrew Economos.  The idea for RCS and its first product, Selector, came to him when he was in charge of computing activity at NBC. Economos saw a need for a way to automate the music scheduling process at company-owned stations, and replace the existing paper-based system, and he proposed the development of music scheduling software.

NBC executives deemed the project not important enough for the network to commit resources to. Economos left NBC after 15 years to develop the product on his own. Initial marketing of Selector was difficult due to the high cost of personal computers, and some resistance from stations who wanted to keep their paper-based scheduling systems. Sales of Selector gradually improved, and by 2006, the product had around 6,000 client stations in 100 countries.

On January 26, 2006, Clear Channel Communications (now iHeartMedia) purchased RCS as a subsidiary company. Clear Channel had acquired automation software company Prophet Systems in 1997. In January 2007, Clear Channel announced that the two companies would be merged. In September 2018, at the NextRadio conference in London, RCS president Philippe Generali announced that GSelector and Zetta would be available as cloud services.

Family of Companies
As RCS has grown, the company has made several acquisitions.
Air Check		real-time analysis of songs and commercials
Florical Systems	television automation and integrated playout
Hit Predictor		listeners rate popular songs
Mediabase		monitored airplay information
Media Monitors	        local media monitoring
Test All Media	        digital media research platform
RCS2GO		        mobile
Revma		        streaming solutions

References

External links
  RCS website
 Check website
  		Florical Systems website
 	Hit Predictor website
   		Mediabase website
 			Media Monitors website
 		Test All Media website
 website
The state of the radio industry - the role of RCS in the industry. (June 21, 1996)

Multinational companies headquartered in the United States
Software companies based in New York (state)
Software companies established in 1979
American companies established in 1979
IHeartMedia
Software companies of the United States